Goodwill Parochial School, also known as Goodwill Day School, was a parochial school for African American children located near Mayesville, Sumter County, South Carolina. It was added to the National Register of Historic Places in 1997.

About 1890, a vernacular two-story, frame building was constructed for the school.  It is sheathed in weatherboard and set upon a brick pier foundation. The school was sponsored and supported by the Presbyterian Church in the U.S.A. until 1933.  From 1933 it was supported by Goodwill Presbyterian Church until 1960 when it was consolidated with the public schools.

References

Presbyterian schools in the United States
School buildings on the National Register of Historic Places in South Carolina
School buildings completed in 1890
Buildings and structures in Sumter County, South Carolina
National Register of Historic Places in Sumter County, South Carolina
Christian schools in South Carolina